Danny Guinane (18 May 1911 – 28 August 1992) was an Australian rules footballer who played with Richmond in the Victorian Football League (VFL).

Guinane, a defender, came to Richmond from South Ballarat. He polled eight Brownlow Medal votes in 1939, the second most by a Richmond player behind Jack Dyer.

He was a back pocket in the 1942 VFL Grand Final, which Richmond lost. Richmond were premiers in both his first and last seasons, but he wasn't selected for either side.

Off the field he worked as a tram driver.

He was the father of Richmond player Paddy Guinane.

References

1911 births
Australian rules footballers from Victoria (Australia)
Richmond Football Club players
South Ballarat Football Club players
1992 deaths